Cabinet of Tadeusz Mazowiecki, led by Prime Minister Tadeusz Mazowiecki, came to power following the 1989 legislative election. He was nominated by the President as the Prime Minister on 24 August 1989 in order to form a new government after the Sejm rejected the Communist cabinet of Czesław Kiszczak, and subsequently obtained the mandatory motion of confidence in the Sejm on 12 September 1989. The cabinet resigned on 25 November 1990, and the Sejm accepted the resignation of the cabinet on 14 December, though it continued to perform its duties until the formation of the Cabinet of Jan Krzysztof Bielecki on 4 January 1991.

 Inaugural composition of the government

 Tadeusz Mazowiecki (Solidarity) - Prime Minister
 Leszek Balcerowicz (Solidarity) - Deputy Prime Minister and Minister of Finance
 Czesław Janicki (ZSL) - Deputy Prime Minister and Minister for Agriculture, Food and Forestry
 Jan Janowski (SD) - Deputy Prime Minister, Minister - Head of the Office of Scientific and Technical Progress and Implementation
 Czesław Kiszczak (PZPR) - Deputy Prime Minister and Minister of Internal Affairs
 Jacek Ambroziak (Solidarity) - Minister - Head of the Cabinet Office
 Artur Balazs (Solidarity) - Minister, member of the Council of Ministers (the social and cultural villages)
 Aleksander Bentkowski (ZSL) - Minister of Justice
 Izabella Cywińska (Solidarity) - Minister of Culture and Art
 Aleksander Hall (Solidarity) - Minister, member of the Cabinet (for work with political organizations and associations)
 Bronisław Kamiński (ZSL) - Minister of Environment and Natural Resources
 Andrzej Kosiniak-Kamysz (ZSL) - Minister of Health and Welfare
 Marek Kucharski (SD) - Minister, member of the Council of Ministers (the organization of the Ministry of Communications)
 Jacek Kuroń (Solidarity) - Minister of Labour and Social Policy
 Aleksander Mackiewicz (SD) - Minister of Internal Market
 Jerzy Osiatyński (Solidarity) - Minister - Head of Central Planning Office
 Aleksander Paszyński (Solidarity) - Minister of Planning and Construction
 Henryk Samsonowicz (Solidarity) - Minister of Education
 Florian Siwicki (Communist) - Minister of National Defence
 Krzysztof Skubiszewski (nonpartisan) - Minister of Foreign Affairs
 Tadeusz Syryjczyk (Solidarity) - Minister of Industry
 Marcin Święcicki (Communist) - Minister of Foreign Economic Cooperation
 Witold Trzeciakowski (Solidarity) - Minister-Member of the Council of Ministers, from December 1989 Chairman of the Economic Council
 Franciszek Wielądek (Communist) - Minister of Transport, shipping and communications

Małgorzata Niezabitowska served as government spokesman.

 Composition of the government on its resignation

 Tadeusz Mazowiecki (Solidarity, Democratic Union) - Prime Minister
 Leszek Balcerowicz (Solidarity) - Deputy Prime Minister and Minister of Finance
 Jan Janowski (SD) - Deputy Prime Minister, Minister - Head of the Office of Scientific and Technical Progress and Implementation
 Jacek Ambroziak (Solidarity) - Minister - Head of the Cabinet Office
 Artur Balazs (Solidarity) - Minister, member of the Council of Ministers (the social and cultural villages)
 Aleksander Bentkowski (PSL) - Minister of Justice
 Janusz Byliński (Solidarity) - Minister of Agriculture and Food
 Izabella Cywińska (Solidarity) - Minister of Culture and Art
 Aleksander Hall (Solidarity) - Minister, member of the Cabinet (for work with political organizations and associations)
 Bronisław Kamiński (Minister) (Polish Peasant Party) - Minister of the Environment, Natural Resources and Forestry
 Piotr Kołodziejczyk (nonpartisan) - Minister of National Defence
 Andrzej Kosiniak-Kamysz (PSL) - Minister of Health and Welfare
 Krzysztof Kozłowski (Solidarity) - Interior Minister
 Jacek Kuroń - Minister of Labour and Social Policy
 Waldemar Kuczyński (Solidarity) - Minister of Privatization
 Aleksander Mackiewicz (SD) - Minister of Internal Market
 Jerzy Osiatyński (Solidarity) - Minister - Head of Central Planning Office
 Aleksander Paszyński (Solidarity) - Minister of Planning and Construction
 Henryk Samsonowicz (Solidarity) - Minister of Education
 Krzysztof Skubiszewski - Minister of Foreign Affairs
 Jerzy Slezak (SD) - Minister of Communications
 Tadeusz Syryjczyk (Solidarity) - Minister of Industry
 Marcin Święcicki (DIRECT) - Minister of Foreign Economic Cooperation
 Witold Trzeciakowski (Solidarity, Democratic Union) - Minister-Member of the Council of Ministers, from December 1989 Chairman of the Economic Council
 Ewaryst Waligórski (Solidarity) - Transport and Maritime Affairs 

 Changes in Composition

 December 20, 1989
 Minister for Agriculture, Food and Forestry Czesław Janicki took office as minister of agriculture and food industries.
 Minister of Environment and Natural Resources Bronisław Kamiński took office as minister of environmental protection, natural resources and forestry.
 Minister of Transport, shipping and communications Franciszek Wielądek took office as Minister of Transport and Maritime Affairs.
 Minister for the organization of the Ministry of Communications Marek Kucharski took office as minister of communications. 
 January 1990
 Transformation of the Ministry of Environment and natural resources in the department of environmental protection, natural resources and forestry. 
 July 6, 1990
 Dismissed:
 Deputy Prime Minister, Minister of Agriculture and Food Czesław Janicki.
 Deputy Interior Minister Czesław Kiszczak.
 Defense minister Florian Siwicki.
 Minister of Transport and Maritime Affairs Franciszek Wielądek. 
 Appointed:
 Krzysztof Kozłowski for the office of Interior Minister.
 Piotr Kołodziejczyk at the office of minister of national defense.
 Ewaryst Waligórski for the office of Minister of Transport and Maritime Affairs. 
 July 13, 1990
 Ministry of Privatization created. 
 September 14, 1990
 Dismissed:
 Communications Minister Marek Kucharski. 
 Appointed:
 Jerzy Slezak for the office of minister of communications.
 Janusz Byliński for the office of minister of agriculture and food industries.
 Waldemar Kuczyński (Solidarity) in the office of the minister of privatization.

Polish government cabinets
History of Poland (1989–present)
1989 establishments in Poland
1991 disestablishments in Poland
Cabinets established in 1989
Cabinets disestablished in 1991